Porodaedalea is a genus of fungi in the family Hymenochaetaceae. The genus was circumscribed by American mycologist William Alphonso Murrill in 1905.

References

Hymenochaetaceae
Agaricomycetes genera
Taxa named by William Alphonso Murrill